Eucithara lamellata is a small sea snail, a marine gastropod mollusk in the family Mangeliidae.

Description
The length of the shell attains 13 mm.

The sutures are deep, a little cavernous. The ribs are narrow, erect, lamelliform, somewhat pointed around the sutures, transversely strongly distantly striate. The color of the shell is yellowish white, faintly zoned with
pale brown.

Distribution
This marine species occurs off the Philippines; in the Indian Ocean off Réunion and Mauritius..

References

  Reeve, L.A. 1846. Monograph of the genus Mangelia. pls 1-8 in Reeve, L.A. (ed). Conchologia Iconica. London : L. Reeve & Co. Vol. 3.
 Drivas, J.; Jay, M. (1987). Coquillages de La Réunion et de l'Île Maurice. Collection Les Beautés de la Nature. Delachaux et Niestlé: Neuchâtel. . 159 pp.

External links
  Tucker, J.K. 2004 Catalog of recent and fossil turrids (Mollusca: Gastropoda). Zootaxa 682:1-1295

lamellata
Gastropods described in 1846